Pedro el Escamoso  is a popular telenovela filmed in Colombia and produced by the Colombian network, Caracol TV (Cadena Radial Colombiana – "Colombian Radio Network").

This novela is about a tacky, overly confident but charming macho man who comes from a small town in Colombia.  Fleeing a problem with "skirts," Pedro moves to the capital (Bogotá) to find his fortune and encounters a series of events and people that change his life dramatically. Pedro is the epitome of a man who can get all the women he wants, but can't get the one he loves. "Escamoso," a Colombian colloquialism for someone who thinks he's "all that," is the perfect descriptor for Pedro, a smooth-talking, expression-spewing show-off ladykiller with a huge ego and a huge heart to match.

Plot 
The story of Pedro Coral Tavera (Miguel Varoni) is animated, colorful, funny, heartwarming and heartbreaking all at the same time. He is not the typical gallant protagonist; he is not rich, he is not handsome, he does not dress well, he thinks he is a good dancer. 
Upon arrival in the big city, Pedro 'stumbles' on and immediately falls in love with Paula Dávila (Sandra Reyes), and in less than 48 hours he ends up being her driver and confidant. Not only that, he also becomes the main livelihood of the Pacheco family, made up exclusively of 3 very lively and strong-willed women who have just lost their beloved husband/father. And so, Pedrito Coral finds himself in the perfect setting to perform and display his scales. He creates his own universe, full of big lies, but with good intentions. And, in the end, this recalcitrant seducer ends up being the key person in the life of every human being who crosses his path, spreading joy, kindness and friendship with his 'smile from ear to ear' and his particular way of dressing, speaking and moving. Also

Cast

Principal 
In order of appearance in the intro

Secondary 
In alphabetical order

Special acts

Special guests 
Celebrities or characters who acted like themselves

Awards and nominations

TVyNovelas Awards

India Catalina Awards

Caracol awards
Best Telenovela
Best Leading Actor: Miguel Varoni
Best Leading Actress: Sandra Reyes
Best Supporting Actress: Alina Lozano
Best Supporting Actor: Jairo Camargo

Other awards
INTE Awards Best Actor Miguel Varoni
Association of Latin Entertainment Critics ACE: Personality of the Year Miguel Varoni
Two Gold in Venezuela: Best Foreign Actor Miguel Varoni
Gold Star in Venezuela: Miguel Varoni
Great eagle in Venezuela: Best Foreign Actor Miguel Varoni
Mara Gold in Venezuela: Best Foreign Actor Miguel Varoni
Orchid in USA: Best Actor Miguel Varoni
Orchid in USA: Best Co-Star Actress Alina Lozano
Orchid in USA: Best Co-Star Actor Jairo Camargo

Versions 
 The Mexican network Televisa made a version titled "  'I love Juan Querendón'  ", starring Eduardo Santamarina in 2007.
 The Portuguese network TVI made in 2003 a version of the telenovela called "  'Coração Malandro'  ", starring Pepê Rapazote.
 The channel France 3 made a French version, called "  'Le Sens de Jean-Louis'  ".

Spin off 
After the telenovela was finished in 2003, Telemundo produced a spin-off called  Como Pedro por su Casa , the series is divided into three sagas, of 20 chapters each. Starring Miguel Varoni. In the first, the Mexican actress Ana de la Reguera will be Pedro Coral's new love, while the Colombian figures Alina Lozano (Mrs. Nidia), Álvaro Bayona (Pastor Gaitán), Fernando Solórzano (René), Jairo Camargo will also be part of the cast. (Alirio Perafán) and Juan Carlos Arango (Enrique Bueno). In the second series, Pedro will travel to the United States and will be accompanied by another Mexican actress, not yet confirmed. Dago García and Luis Felipe Salamanca, librettists of the series, have already written the first 20 episodes. "Como Pedro por su casa" is recorded in the new studios that Canal Caracol has just opened in Bogotá, under the direction of Juan Carlos Villamizar, produced by Orlando Jiménez and directing assistance from Adriana Ferreira.

See also 
 List of Colombian TV Shows

References 

2001 telenovelas
2001 Colombian television series debuts
2001 Colombian television series endings
Colombian telenovelas
Colombian comedy
Spanish-language telenovelas
Caracol Televisión telenovelas
Television shows set in Bogotá